A qanbūs is a short-necked lute that originated in Yemen and spread throughout the Arabian peninsula. Sachs considered that it derived its name from the Turkic komuz, but it is more comparable to the oud. The instrument was related to or a descendant of the barbat, a (possibly) skin-topped lute from Central Asia. The qanbūs has 6 or 7 nylon strings that are plucked with a plectrum to generate sound. Unlike many other lute-family instruments, the gambus has no frets. Its popularity declined in Yemen during the early 20th century reign of Imam Yahya; by the beginning of the 21st century, the oud had replaced the qanbūs as the instrument of choice for Middle-Eastern lutenists.

Yemen migration saw the instrument spread to different parts of the Indian Ocean. In Muslim Southeast Asia (especially Indonesia, Malaysia and Brunei), called the gambus, it sparked a whole musical genre of its own. In the Comoros it is known as gabusi, and in Zanzibar as gabbus.

In Yemen and Oman
The qanbus is a traditional instrument from Yemen carved from a single block of wood. It is also played in Oman, where it is called gabbus. The lower half of the top is covered in skin, and the upper half has a wooden soundboard, often with small soundholes. It has a floating bridge, a sickle-shaped pegbox and usually 7 nylon or gut strings in 4 courses, with the lowest course single. There also exist 3-course versions, with 6 or 5 strings, though these are less common.

The Yemeni lute has 7 strings in four courses, tuned low note to high C  DD  GG  CC. The first C string is a single string; strings D G and C are all pairs.

In East Africa

In Kenya and Tanzania, a related instrument was called the Kibangala. It used to be built and strung in the same way as the Qanbus. In the Comoros islands, a related instrument called the Gambusi is played, which is built in the same way but often has a flat-shaped pegbox, rather than the sickle-shape, and sometimes has a differently shaped soundbox. Both usually have 4 courses of strings, which can be double or single.  Several structural nuances exist between the original design (Anjouan, Mwali) and the later avatars in Mayotte. The corrupted pronouciations Gaboussi, Gabusi, or Gaboussa are also met in Mayotte, and obviously preaches for a joined etymology with the Kabosy chordophone in N-W Madagascar.

In Indonesia and Malaysia

The word gambus covers a variety of instruments, some with skin soundboards, some with wooden soundboards, some that are shaped like the Yemeni quanbūs, and some that are shaped like the Arabian oud. The instruments may have 3, 4 or 5 courses of strings, plus a single base string. To avoid confusion, various descriptors are used in the names by academic researchers.

"" can be used to refer simply to either type of instrument. The instruments are different than the Hasapi boat lutes. The instruments were "transmitted" from the Muslim world to the Malay world at an undermined time. Links to the Middle East begin as early as the 5th-6th centuries C.E., with trading networks and occupation in the 15th century. Experts have tentatively given dates for the instruments' arrival between the 9th and 15th centuries C.E. In looking for origins, musicologists have also noted some similarities with the Chinese pipa.

The two types of  likely arrived at different times; the  likely arriving as the quanbus or barbat and developing over centuries. The  likely developed in the 19th century after the arrival of the oud.

Elsewhere in Indonesia, some other well known corruptions are Gambusu and  Gambusi, respectively observed in Sulawesi and Gorontalo..In Lombok, the mandoline-shaped gambus - actually a vague, fretless copy of Gibson's A-type bluegrass mandoline -  is also locally named Manolin  which used to accompany Kemidi Rudat plays or Kecimol entertainment.

Gambus Melayu or gambus Hijaz
It retains a shape similar to the original qanbūs. It has a skin soundboard.

Tuning: 
Indonesia, in most places:A3  D4D4  G4G4  C5C5
Riau Islands: G3 D4D4  G4G4  C5C5 for wire strings or A3  D4D4  G4G4  C5C5 for nylon strings
Eastern Sumatra: G  AA  B  DD  AA  EE (double courses tuned in unison)
Brunei: E3E3  A3A3  D4D4 or DD GG  CC

Gambus Hadhramaut
The gambus Hadhraumaut is a gambus that resembles an oud.  The name Hadhramaut refers to Eastern Yemen, and this form of the instrument may have arrived in Indonesia (and a wider extent to another Malay world countries) with immigrants from there in the 19th century, joining Muslim communities already established centuries earlier. The bowl is made of light woods, the neck of a hardwood. It has a wooden soundboard. It is a fretless instrument with 11 strings in 6 courses, tuned low note to high:
(Notes in scientific pitch notation)
Arab tuning for oud: C2 F2F2  A2A2  D3D3  G3G3  C4C4
Alternate for oud C EE  AA  DD  GG  CC
Circle of fifths: B2 E3E3  A3A3  D4D4  G4G4  C5C5
Circle of fifths: B EE  AA  DD  GG  BB
Ghazal: A, DD, GG, CC, FF, BbBb

Gambus Seludang
The Gambus Seludang was another name for the gambus Hijaz with a specific reference to its monoxyle (like boat constructed from a  single piece of timber) structure. The name came with the revival  in Brunei, Riau and Sabah. In Sabah, this is similar in shape and size to the gambus Hijaz, but features a wooden resonator.

Similar instruments
Gittern – a medieval European instrument built in the same way, but with a completely wooden soundboard.

See also

 Mirwas
 Zapin
 Oud
 Barbat

Sources

References

 Poche, Christian. "Qanbūs". Grove Music Online (subscription required). ed. L. Macy. Retrieved on August 15, 2007.
 Gambus - Musical instruments of Malaysia
 Charles Capwell, Contemporary Manifestations of Yemeni-Derived Song and Dance in Indonesia, Yearbook for Traditional Music, Vol. 27, (1995), pp. 76–89 reg
 Kinzer, Joe. "The Agency of a Lute: Post-Field Reflections on the Materials of Music." Blog post. Ethnomusicology Review: Notes from the Field. UCLA,2016.

External links 

The Gambus Project

Further reading
 Qanbus, Kigangala, & Gabusi: A Portfolio. Monoxyle Lutes/Index v.21 March 2016

Southeast Asian music
Arabic musical instruments
Bruneian musical instruments
Comorian musical instruments
Indonesian musical instruments
Malaysian musical instruments
Yemeni musical instruments
Arab inventions
Necked bowl lutes
Guitars